Events from the year 1777 in art.

Events
 The Cane Tago, a terracotta statue of a dog, is erected in Bologna, Italy.
 Kunsthochschule Kassel is founded.
Det Dramatiske Selskab is founded in Copenhagen (Denmark) as an acting academy.

Works

 Antonio Carnicero – Portrait of Pedro Rodríguez, Conde de Campomanes
 Thomas Gainsborough
 Portrait of his daughter Mary
 Pomeranian Bitch and Puppy ("Two Fox Dogs" – approximate date)
 Francisco Goya – The Parasol (tapestry cartoon – approximate date)
 Jean-Baptiste Greuze – Portrait of Benjamin Franklin
 William Hoare – Portrait of Christopher Anstey with his daughter
 Ozias Humphry – Portrait of George Stubbs
 Thomas Jones – Lake Albano – Sunset
 Philip James de Loutherbourg – Moonlight
 Sir Joshua Reynolds – Portrait of Henry Thrale
 John Francis Rigaud – Agostino Carlini, Francesco Bartolozzi and Giovanni Battista Cipriani
 George Romney – The Gower Family: The Children of Granville, 2nd Earl Gower
 Alexander Roslin – Portraits of
 Ivan Betskoy
 Catherine the Great
 Natalya Golitsyna
 Gustavus III of Sweden
 John Trumbull – Self-portrait
 John Webber – The Tahitian Princess Poedua, the daughter of Orio, Chief of Raiatea

Births
 January 2 – Christian Daniel Rauch, German sculptor (died 1857)
 January 7 – Lorenzo Bartolini, Italian sculptor (died 1850)
 March 9 – Aleksander Orłowski, Polish painter and sketch maker, pioneer of lithography in the Russian Empire (died 1832)
 March 10 – Louis Hersent, French painter (died 1860)
 March 13 – John Bacon, English sculptor (died 1859)
 June 20 – Jean-Eugène-Charles Alberti, Dutch painter working primarily in Paris (died 1843)
 June 22 (bapt.) – John Thirtle, English watercolour painter and frame-maker (died 1839)
 July 23 – Philipp Otto Runge, German painter (died 1810)
 August 11 – Giuseppe Bossi, Italian painter, arts administrator and writer on art (died 1815)
 October 15 – Christian David Gebauer, Danish animal painter and etcher (died 1831)
 October 16 – J. L. Lund, Danish painter especially of historical subjects (died 1867)
 November 1 – Per Krafft the Younger, Swedish portrait and historical painter (died 1863)
 December 15 – Agostino Aglio, Italian painter, decorator, and engraver (died 1857)
 December 17 – François Marius Granet, French painter (died 1849)
 date unknown
 George Bullock, English sculptor (died 1818)
 Gustaf Erik Hedman, Finnish painter (died 1841)
 Matthew Cotes Wyatt, English painter and sculptor (died 1862)

Deaths
 April 29 – Antonio Joli, Italian painter of veduta (born 1700)
 May 21 – John Cleveley the Elder, English marine artist (born 1712)
 June 22 – Johann Joseph Christian, German Baroque sculptor and woodcarver (born 1706)
 July 13 – Guillaume Coustou the Younger, French painter (born 1716)
 August 23 – Charles-Joseph Natoire, French rococo painter (born 1700)
 November 17 - Johan Stålbom, Finnish painter who later lived and worked in Sweden (born 1712)
 December 2 – Lorenzo De Caro, Neapolitan Baroque painter (born 1719)
 December 5 – Claude François Devosge, French sculptor and architect (born 1697)
 date unknown
 Jean Charles Baquoy, French engraver (born 1721)
 Pierre-Charles Canot, French engraver who spent most of his career in England (born 1710)
 Nicholas Thomas Dall, Danish landscape painter (date of birth unknown)
 probable – Francesco Pavona, Italian painter primarily of pastel portraits (born 1695)

 
Years of the 18th century in art
1770s in art